Mohamed Zain "Jins" Shamsudin (Jawi: محمد زين بن شمس الدين; born 5 November 1935 – 1 March 2017) was a Malaysian film actor, director,  politician, writer and producer.

Early life and film career

Mohamed Jin was born in Taiping, Perak on 5 November 1935. He went to SMK King Edward VII Taiping, Perak and he completed his Senior Cambridge exams in 1956, hoping to continue his studies at the University of Malaya in Singapore (currently the National University of Singapore). His hopes were dashed when the university's admission officer said that they would "keep his application in view". His great-uncle, who was a teacher at the prestigious Anderson School in Ipoh, however managed to apply for a place to study electrical engineering in England three months into the deadline. Jins would use this spare time to take nightly English courses while he stayed with a relative who was the director for Radio Malaysia's education wing.

Meanwhile, there were rehearsals of a play that were going on nearby, in which Jins would watch them daily. The lead actor of the play would later choose him as his stand-in, with the blessings of the cast and crew, when it was learnt that the lead's mother fell ill and the lead had to attend to her. When the lead actor's mother died and he could not resume his role, Jins's stand-in became permanent. The play would eventually open at the Victoria Memorial Hall in Singapore. This is where he would be discovered by a Shaw Brothers public relations officer, who approached him about wanting to act in a movie. He agreed, and thus made his screen debut in Keadilan Illahi in 1956. He went on to act in several films until eventually becoming a main star in 1957 through Pancha Delima, a film directed by P Ramlee.

Rising popularity and other ventures 
From 1966 to 1968, Jins had starred in several action movies produced by Malay Film Production where he portrays Jefri Zain, a James Bond-like spy character.

He had pursued his studies in the London Film School from 1970 to 1972, obtaining his Diploma in Motion Picture Technology and graduated with first class honours.

In 1981, Jins collaborated with the Royal Malaysia Police to produce and direct Bukit Kepong; a film dramatizing the Bukit Kepong incident, which was a chaotic armed conflict between the Malayan police and Malayan Communist Party gunmen during the Malayan Emergency. The movie, which costed about RM1.3 million to make and collected RM1.7 million at the box-office, won eight awards in the 3rd Malaysia Film Festival the next year including the Best Film category. The film eventually went under a restoration project by KRU Studios in 2014.

For much of his life, Jins was interested in making a film about the events that led to the assassination of the British official J.W.W. Birch in Perak in 1875. A newspaper report indicated that he had begun work on such a film in 1992, but it was not completed. In 2004, Jins announced plans to make an epic English-language film entitled The King of the River: Pasir Salak, though the project was ultimately never realized. Even five years later in 2009, Jins expressed his eagerness for the project that he considered his lifelong ambition, saying "I hope to complete my movie on the historical events that happened in Pasir Salak before I die."

Political career
On 13 October 2004, he became the first actor-politician in Malaysia following his appointment as a member of the Dewan Negara in the 11th Parliament of Malaysia. He continued to be a Senator for two terms until 11 February 2011.

Personal life
Jins was first married to actress Rahmah Rahmat in Singapore in 1961, from which their marriage bore a son named Jeffry Jins. Their marriage however was short-lived, eventually divorcing in 1963. In 1986, he married Halijah Abdullah. They had two children together, Putera Hang Jebat and Putera Hang Nadim.

Death
Jins died at 5:45 pm at a clinic in Taman Melawati after choking on cekodok on Wednesday, 1 March 2017 at the age of 81, as confirmed by his second son Putera Hang Nadim.

Honours and awards
 Ahli Mangku Negara (A.M.N.) (1986)
 Silver Crane Award at the Asia-Pacific Film Festival (1987)
 Datuk Paduka Mahkota Perak (DPMP), which carries the title 'Datuk' from the Sultan of Perak (1990)
 Kesatria Mangku Negara (K.M.N.) (1990)
 Johan Setia Mahkota (J.S.M.) (1993)
 Honorary Master of Letters by Universiti Sains Malaysia (1999)
 the Veteran Artist Award at the Anugerah Bintang Popular (2004)
 Panglima Jasa Negara (P.J.N.), which carries the title Datuk (2004)
 Panglima Setia Mahkota (P.S.M.), which carries the title Tan Sri (2007)
 Anugerah Seniman Negara (2009)

Filmography

Film

Television series
{| class="wikitable"
! Year
! Title
! Role 
! TV channel
! Notes
|- 
|1993
| Roda Roda Kotaraya
| Supt Rahman
| TV1
|
|-
| 2004–2005
| Masih Ada Cinta 
| Zahran 
| TV3 
|
|- 
| 2005
| Mahligai Gading| Tan Sri Suffian
| rowspan="2"|TV1
|
|-
| 2007
| Dinasti Bilut| Tan Sri Mustafa
|
|-
| 2008
| Roda-Roda Kuala Lumpur (Season 2)
|
| TV2 
| Special appearance
|- 
| 2011 
| Tahajjud Cinta| Tan Sri 
| TV3
|
|- 
|}

Telemovie

References

Bibliography
 Jins Shamsuddin: Kembara Seorang Seniman'' (Jins Shamsuddin: Adventures of the Artists). Mohd Zamberi A. Malek. Finas. 2007. 

External links
 

1935 births
2017 deaths
Deaths from asthma
People from Perak
Malaysian people of Malay descent
Malaysian Muslims
Alumni of the London Film School
Malaysian male film actors
20th-century Malaysian male actors
Malaysian film directors
Malaysian actor-politicians
United Malays National Organisation politicians
Members of the Dewan Negara
Members of the Order of the Defender of the Realm
Officers of the Order of the Defender of the Realm
Companions of the Order of Loyalty to the Crown of Malaysia
Commanders of the Order of Meritorious Service
Commanders of the Order of Loyalty to the Crown of Malaysia
Malay-language film directors
Malay Film Productions contract players
Pesona Pictures contract players